Wetterspitze is a German word literally meaning "weather peak". It may refer to the following mountains: